Nicholas Kalogeropoulos (Greek: Νικόλαος Καλογερόπουλος; born 18 February 1945), also known as Nicky Kalo, is a retired Greek tennis player who won a bronze medal at the 1971 Mediterranean Games. In doubles, he finished runner-up at the 1968 Italian Open. He was ranked as best Greek player in 1962–74 and was a member of the Greek Davis Cup team in 1963–81.

Kalogeropoulos was born in Costa Rica to Greek parents, where he started training in tennis and spent many years of his life. In 1962 he won the junior Wimbledon and French Championships. He retired in 1978.

Career finals

Doubles (3 runner-ups)

References

External links

 
 
 

Greek male tennis players
1945 births
Living people
Mediterranean Games bronze medalists for Greece
Competitors at the 1971 Mediterranean Games
Mediterranean Games medalists in tennis
Grand Slam (tennis) champions in boys' singles
Wimbledon junior champions
French Championships junior (tennis) champions
Sportspeople from San José, Costa Rica